Silsilay is a Pakistani drama series written by Samra Bukhari and directed by Iman khan Hussain. It stars Junaid Khan, Hiba Bukhari, Momal Sheikh, Muneeb Butt in lead roles. The drama was first aired 2 January 2018 on Geo Entertainment, where it aired every Tuesday at 8:00 P.M.

Plot 
This drama depicts the life of two sisters, Abeeha and Hira. Abeeha (Momal Sheikh)and Shahzaib (Muneeb Butt)are childhood friends and neighbours but Abeeha (Momal Sheikh)is in one-sided love with Shahzaib (Muneeb Butt). However, Shahzaib fall in love with Rohi( Maryam Noor). The other story is about  Hira (Hiba Bukhari)who falls in love with her cousin  Jawad (Junaid Khan). However,  Jawad decided to marry Ujala (Sara Bhatti). She is disrupts Hira and Abeeha life-she belongs to very rich family. Hira decides  to leave her family because of Ujala but after a while she realized that her family and mother were right and she returns  to her home. Later on  Jawad realized that Ujala is not right for him or perfect and he breaks up with her. And Shahzaib (Muneeb Butt) also falls in love with Abeeha but he didn't know about it , Rohi realized  that he is in love with Abeeha. And after that Abeeha, Shahzaib & Hira, Jawad got married.

Cast 
Junaid Khan as Jawad(protagonist)
Hiba Bukhari as Hira(protagonist)
Momal Sheikh as Abeeha(protagonist)
Muneeb Butt as Shahzaib(protagonist)
Shagufta Ejaz as Tanzila(protagonist)
Seemi Raheel as Naila(protagonist)
Mehmood Aslam as Ateeque((antagonist)
Sara Bhatti as Ujala(antagonist)
Mahjabeen Habeeb as Sammiya
Abdullah Ejaz as Wahab
Maryam Noor as Roohi
Najia Baig
Owais Shaikh as Jami (servant)

References

External links 
 Silsilay on Har Pal Geo

Pakistani drama television series